CineMagic may refer to:

 CineMagic (film technique), the film development technique pioneered by Sidney W. Pink
 CineMagic (film festival), an international children's film festival in Belfast, Northern Ireland
 Cinemagic (Sirius XM), a soundtrack music channel on satellite radio
 CineMagic Co., a Japanese adult film production company
 Cinemagic (Dave Grusin album), 1987

See also
 Disney Cinemagic